Florin Curta (born January 15, 1965) is a Romanian-born American archaeologist and historian who is a Professor of Medieval History and Archaeology at the University of Florida.

Biography
Curta works in the field of  Balkan history and is a Professor of Medieval History and Archaeology at the University of Florida in Gainesville, Florida. Curta's first book, The Making of the Slavs. History and Archaeology of the Lower Danube Region, A.D. 500–700, was named a 2002 Choice Outstanding Academic Title and won the Herbert Baxter Adams Award of the American Historical Association in 2003. Curta is the editor-in-chief of the Brill series East Central and Eastern Europe in the Middle Ages, 450–1450. In 2011, he contributed to The Edinburgh History of the Greeks. He is a member of the Institute for Advanced Study, School of Historical Studies, Princeton University (Spring 2007) and a visiting fellow, Corpus Christi College, Oxford University (2015). He attends an Eastern Orthodox Christian parish.

Theories and criticism
Being inspired by Reinhard Wenskus and the Vienna School of History, Curta is known for his usage of post-processual and post-structuralist approach in explaining Slavic ethnogenesis and migrations by, which argues against the mainstream view and primordial culture-historical approach in archaeology and historiography. Curta argues against theories of Slavic mass expansion from the Slavic Urheimat and denies the existence of the Slavic Urheimat.  His work rejects ideas of Slavic languages as the unifying element of the Slavs or the adducing of Prague-type ceramics as an archaeological cultural expression of the Early Slavs. Instead, Curta advances  an alternative (revisionist) hypothesis which considers the Slavs as an "ethno-political category" invented by the Byzantines which was formed by political instrumentation and interaction on the Roman Danubian frontier where barbarian elite culture flourished. 

Curta’s conjectures were met with substantial disagreement and "severe criticism in general and in detail" by other archaeologists, historians, linguists and ethnologists. They criticized what they saw as Curta's arbitrary selection of historical and archaeological data, sites and his interpretation of chronologies to support preconceived conclusions. In addition, they felt his cultural model inadequately explained the emergence and spread of the Slavs and Slavic culture. Curta has also been criticized for inadequate argumentation and for contradicting information given by Byzantine historiographers such as Theophylact Simocatta.

Although Curta's work found support by those who use a similar approach, like Walter Pohl and Danijel Dzino, the migrationist model remains in the view of many the most acceptable and possible to explain the spread of the Slavs as well as Slavic culture (including language).

Bibliography
  (Doctoral Dissertation)

Edited volumes 
 East Central & Eastern Europe in the Early Middle Ages. Ann Arbor: University of Michigan Press, 2005.
 Borders, Barriers, and Ethnogenesis. Frontiers in Late Antiquity and the Middle Ages. Turnhout, Belgium: Brepols, 2005.
 The other Europe in the Middle Ages. Avars, Bulgars, Khazars, and Cumans. Leiden-Boston: Brill, 2008.
 Neglected Barbarians. Turnhout: Brepols, 2011.
 with Bogdan-Petru Maleon, The Steppe Lands and the World Beyond Them. Studies in Honor of Victor Spinei on his 70th Birthday. Iași: Editura Universității "Alexandru Ioan Cuza", 2013.

References 

1965 births
Living people
20th-century American historians
20th-century American male writers
21st-century American historians
20th-century Romanian historians
21st-century Romanian historians
Place of birth missing (living people)
American archaeologists
American medievalists
Romanian archaeologists
Romanian medievalists
Historians of the Balkans
Romanian emigrants to the United States
University of Florida faculty
American Byzantinists
Byzantine archaeologists
American male non-fiction writers
Medieval archaeologists